Taresa Tolosa Bekuma (born 15 June 1998) is an Ethiopian middle-distance runner who competes primarily in the 1500 metres. He represented his country at the 2017 World Championships without finishing his heat. A year earlier he won the silver medal at the 2016 World U20 Championships.

International competitions

Personal bests

800 metres – 1:50.74 (Hengelo 2017)
1500 metres – 3:34.47 (Hengelo 2017)

References

1998 births
Living people
Ethiopian male middle-distance runners
World Athletics Championships athletes for Ethiopia
21st-century Ethiopian people